Anıl Demir (born 4 November 1996) is a Turkish footballer who plays as a goalkeeper for Ümraniyespor.

Professional career
Demir is a youth product of Pendikspor and Fenerbahçe. He signed a professional contract with Fenerbahçe in 2013, and was assigned to their youth teams. He joined Tarsus İdman Yurdu on loan for the 2017–18 season in the TFF Third League, and helped the team earn promotion. He permanently transferred to Tarsus İdman Yurdu when his loan ended in 2018. On 1 July 2021, he transferred to TFF First League club Ümraniyespor, acting as backup goalkeeper. He helped the club earn promotion into the Süper Lig for the 2022–23 season. He made his professional debut with Ümraniyespor in a 5–2 Süper Lig loss to Beşiktaş on 30 October 2022.

International career
Demir was born in Turkey and is of Serbian descent. He is a youth international for Turkey, having played up to the Turkey U18s. In March 2015 he received an offer to represent Serbia internationally.

References

External links
 
 

1996 births
Living people
People from Pendik
Turkish footballers
Turkey youth international footballers
Fenerbahçe S.K. footballers
Turkish people of Serbian descent
Tarsus Idman Yurdu footballers
Ümraniyespor footballers
Süper Lig players
TFF First League players
TFF Second League players
TFF Third League players
Association football goalkeepers